Elanders is a Swedish printing company doing business in ten countries and directing a number of subsidiaries. Since 1989 the company has been listed on the OMX Nordic Exchange.

History
Elanders was created from a print office founded in 1908 by Otto Elander, Nils Hellner and Emil Ekström in Sweden.

In January 2007 Elanders acquired the Sommer Corporate Media in Waiblingen, Germany.
5 years later, in March 2012 the acquisition of the fotokasten and the d|o|m Deutsche Online Medien GmbH in Waiblingen followed.
 
Elanders continued its strategic enterprise development in the area of photo finishing by acquiring the Berlin-based photobook manufacturer myphotobook GmbH with business operations throughout Europe in 2013.

References

External links
 Elanders Group

Mass media companies of Sweden
Printing companies
Publishing companies established in 1908
Swedish companies established in 1908